The 2011 MBC Drama Awards is a ceremony honoring the outstanding achievement in television on the Munhwa Broadcasting Corporation (MBC) network for the year of 2011. It was held on December 30, 2011 and hosted by Jung Joon-ho and Lee Ha-nui.

Nominations and winners
(Winners denoted in bold)

References

External links
http://www.imbc.com/broad/tv/ent/event/2011mbc/

MBC Drama Awards
MBC Drama Awards
MBC Drama Awards